Laogai District is a district of the Shan State in Myanmar. It consists 2 towns and 333 villages.

It is located in Kokang Self-Administered Zone according to the Constitution of Myanmar (2008).

Townships
The district contains the following townships:

Laukkaing Township, or Laukkai Township
Kongyan Township, or Konkyan Township

See also
Constitution of Burma
Kokang incident

References

Districts of Myanmar
Geography of Shan State